Scopula annubiata is a moth of the family Geometridae. It was described by Staudinger in 1892. It is endemic to Uzbekistan.

References

Moths described in 1892
annubiata
Endemic fauna of Uzbekistan
Moths of Asia
Taxa named by Otto Staudinger